The Moesa Region is one of the eleven administrative districts in the Canton of the Grisons (or in German: Graubünden) in Switzerland. It was created on 1 January 2017 as part of a reorganization of the Canton.

The region borders with the Viamala Region to the north, with Italy to the east (Lombardy: Province of Sondrio and of Como) and with the Canton of Ticino (districts of Bellinzona to the southwest, Riviera and Blenio) to the west.

Politics

Administrative division 

The Moesa region is divided into 12 municipalities:

References

Regions of Graubünden